Sexilla Stundilla is a 1976 Indian Malayalam film, directed by B. N. Prakash and produced by T. E. Vasudevan. The film stars Jayabharathi, KPAC Lalitha, Adoor Bhasi and Manavalan Joseph in the lead roles. The film has musical score by V. Dakshinamoorthy.

Cast 

Vincent
Jayabharathi
KPAC Lalitha
Adoor Bhasi
Manavalan Joseph
Jameela Malik
Kuthiravattam Pappu
Paravoor Bharathan

Soundtrack 
The music was composed by V. Dakshinamoorthy and the lyrics were written by Sreekumaran Thampi.

References

External links 
 

1976 films
1970s Malayalam-language films